Młyny may refer to the following places:
Młyny, Kuyavian-Pomeranian Voivodeship (north-central Poland)
Młyny, Subcarpathian Voivodeship (south-east Poland)
Młyny, Świętokrzyskie Voivodeship (south-central Poland)
Młyny, Opole Voivodeship (south-west Poland)
Młyny, West Pomeranian Voivodeship (north-west Poland)